WCWW-LD (channel 25) is a low-power television station in South Bend, Indiana, United States, affiliated with The CW. It is owned by Weigel Broadcasting alongside two other low-power stations: ABC affiliate WBND-LD (channel 57) and MyNetworkTV affiliate WMYS-LD (channel 69). The stations share studios on Generations Drive (near the Indiana Toll Road) in northeastern South Bend, while WCWW-LD's transmitter is located just off the St. Joseph Valley Parkway on the city's south side.

Due to its low-power status, its broadcasting radius only covers the immediate South Bend area. Therefore, Weigel relies on paid television subscription carriage for all three of its South Bend television stations to reach the entire market.

WCWW-LD is one of two CW affiliates owned by Weigel, the other being company flagship WCIU-TV in Chicago.

History
The station was founded on August 31, 1990 as W25BM, operating as an affiliate of the Three Angels Broadcasting Network; it later changed its callsign to WYGN-LP in October 1995. On March 14, 2002, the station was transferred to its current owner, Weigel Broadcasting, who had been previously broadcasting general entertainment programming on what is now WYGN-LD; it also dropped 3ABN which went to WYGN-LD, changed its callsign to WRDY-LP, and began simulcasting ABC programming from sister station WBND-LP; that fall, the station dropped the WBND-LP simulcast and affiliated with The WB, which moved to WRDY-LP from the original WMWB-LP (now WMYS-LD), and it adopted the WMWB-LP callsign previously held by channel 69 to reflect its new affiliation with the network.

On March 1, 2006, Weigel officials announced that WMWB would affiliate with The CW, a network formed out of the struggling WB and UPN networks in partnership with the two networks' owners Time Warner and CBS Corporation, when it premiered in September; channel 25 changed its call letters to WCWW-LP upon the network's launch on September 18, 2006. The WCWW calls had belonged to sister station WMYS, which took an affiliation with CW competitor MyNetworkTV (which launched two weeks earlier); the two stations both have borne the WRDY and WYGN calls.

In early August 2008, Weigel Broadcasting agreed to sell all three of its South Bend stations, including WCWW, to Schurz Communications, the longtime owner of the local CBS affiliate WSBT-TV (channel 22), for undisclosed terms. However, in the absence of action by the Federal Communications Commission, the deal was called off in August 2009.

With Weigel flagship WCIU-TV's assumption of the CW affiliation in Chicago on September 1, 2019, Weigel now owns both of the network's affiliates on the southern shore of Lake Michigan.

Programming

Syndicated programming
Syndicated programming seen on WCWW-LD includes talk shows such as The Steve Wilkos Show, The Kelly Clarkson Show, The Maury Povich Show, and The Jerry Springer Show, court shows such as The People's Court, Judge Mathis, Hot Bench, and Judge Jerry, and several syndicated sit-coms.

Newscasts

On March 19, 2012, WCWW-LD debuted a nightly half-hour prime time newscast at 10 p.m. that is produced by WBND-LD (entitled ABC 57 News at 10 on CW 25). WBND also produces two hours of morning news on WCWW from 7–9 a.m. weekday mornings.

Technical information

Subchannels
The station's digital signal is multiplexed:

In July 2010, WCWW-LD launched a second digital subchannel on 25.2 as an affiliate of This TV.

In September 2018, WCWW-LD's digital subchannel 25.2 replaced This TV with Start TV. This TV moved to a newly launched third subchannel.

In February 2019, WCWW-LD added a high-definition simulcast of sister station WBND-LD on digital subchannel 25.4.

In September 2021, WCWW-LD replaced a simulcast of WBND-LD on digital subchannel 25.4 with MeTV's expansion network, MeTV Plus.

In March 2022, WCWW-LD launched a fifth digital subchannel on 25.5 as an affiliate of Story Television.

Analog-to-digital conversion
On September 14, 2007, WCWW and its sister stations began broadcasting low-power digital signals. WCWW-LD broadcasts with an effective radiated power of 25 kW on channel 25. On December 28, 2010, WCWW-LP turned off its analog signal on channel 25 because of equipment failure. On April 16, 2012, the FCC granted WCWW-LP a construction permit to move its digital frequency from channel 27 to its former analog allotment, UHF channel 25.

References

External links
WCWW-LD "The CW 25 Michiana"

Weigel Broadcasting
The CW affiliates
This TV affiliates
Start TV affiliates
CWW-LD
Television channels and stations established in 1990
Low-power television stations in the United States
1990 establishments in Indiana